Richard Napoleon Batchelder (July 27, 1832 – January 4, 1901) was a United States Army Officer and the 18th Quartermaster General of the United States Army. Brigadier General Batchelder was awarded the Medal of Honor in 1891.

Early life
Richard N. Batchelder was born to Nathan and Peace Batchelder on July 27, 1832, in Laconia, New Hampshire. His father was a state representative, and his mother was the daughter of a prominent pastor. Richard attended the county school system of Manchester. During early adulthood he endeavored in many ventures, one of which was business.

Military career
At the start of the American Civil War he quit private enterprise and enlisted in the Union Army in May 1861. Upon joining the Army, he was commissioned as a first lieutenant, and took duty as regimental quartermaster for the 1st New Hampshire Volunteer Infantry. He was promoted to the rank of captain in August 1861, and became a Divisional Quartermaster in March 1862. He eventually promoted to lieutenant colonel and chief quartermaster of II Corps in January 1863.

During one of his missions in October 1863, the corps' supply units were bombarded by the enemy, and because of his leadership, his unit was able to successfully accomplish the mission without any loss of supplies. This feat would later earn him the Medal of Honor, and he was promoted to Colonel with the title of Chief Quartermaster of the Army of the Potomac the next year. Batchelder was mustered out of the volunteer service on June 8, 1865, and was transferred to the Regular Army, reverting to the rank of captain.

On January 13, 1866, President Andrew Johnson nominated Batchelder for appointment to the rank of brevet brigadier general of Volunteers, to rank from March 13, 1865, and the U.S. Senate confirmed the appointment on March 12, 1866. On February 23, 1869, President Andrew Johnson nominated Batchelder for appointment to the grade of brevet brigadier general, U.S. Army (Regular Army), to rank from April 9, 1865, and the U.S. Senate confirmed the appointment on March 3, 1869.

After the Civil War, Batchelder then served at various commands across the country under the quartermaster branch for 25 years before he was promoted to brigadier general on June 26, 1890. With this promotion he was appointed as the 18th Quartermaster General of the United States Army.  As Quartermaster General of the Army he was also in charge of the creation of the emblem used to identify the Quartermaster Corps.  He retired from the Army on July 27, 1896.

General Batchelder was a member of the Military Order of the Loyal Legion of the United States, the Sons of the Revolution and the Society of Colonial Wars.

Medal of Honor Citation

Rank and Organization: Lieutenant Colonel and Chief Quartermaster, 2d Corps. Place and Date: Between Catlett and Fairfax Stations, Va., 13–15 October 1863. Entered Service At: Manchester, N.H. Born: 27 July 1832, Meredith, N.H. Date of Issue: 20 May 1895.

"The President of the United States in the name of The Congress takes pleasure in presenting the MEDAL OF HONOR to LIEUTENANT COLONEL & CHIEF QUARTERMASTER RICHARD NAPOLEON BATCHELDER
UNITED STATES ARMY For service as set forth in the following CITATION:

Being ordered to move his trains by a continuous day-and-night march, and without the usual military escort, armed his teamsters and personally commanded them, successfully fighting against heavy odds and bringing his trains through without the loss of a wagon.

Dates of Rank

Later life
Richard N. Batchelder retired from the U.S. Army on July 27, 1896. He died in Washington D.C. on January 4, 1901, and was buried at Arlington National Cemetery, in Arlington, Virginia.

Notes

References
 "Brigadier General Richard N. Batchelder – Quartermaster General 1890–1896." Army Quartermaster Foundation, Inc. 19 Nov. 2000. Web. 18 Feb. 2011.
 Eicher, John H., and David J. Eicher, Civil War High Commands. Stanford: Stanford University Press, 2001. .
 Colonel Richard N. Batchelder (Civil War) "Medal of Honor Winners." Army Quartermaster Foundation, Inc. Web. 14 Feb. 2011.
 "Richard Batchelder, Medal of Honor." Home Of Heroes Home Page. Web. 18 Feb. 2011.

External links
 

1832 births
1901 deaths
United States Army Medal of Honor recipients
Burials at Arlington National Cemetery
People of New Hampshire in the American Civil War
Quartermasters General of the United States Army
Union Army officers
United States Army generals
American Civil War recipients of the Medal of Honor